Oláh or Olah is a Hungarian language surname, which means "Romanian", derived from the word volách, and from that vlach, meaning "Italian" or "speaker of a Romance language". 

It's unclear how the surname came about. People who have this surname might have Romanian ancestry and possibly went through a process of Magyarization in the past.

Related names include Vlach and Olasz. The surname may refer to:

Adrian Olah (born 1981), Romanian football player
Dávid Oláh (born 1988), Hungarian football player
Franz Olah (1910–2009), Austrian politician
George Olah (1927-2017), Hungarian chemist
Gergő Oláh (footballer) (born 1989), Hungarian football player
Gergő Oláh (singer) (born 1988), Hungarian singer 
Ibolya Oláh (born 1978), Hungarian singer
István Oláh (1926–1985), Hungarian politician
Karin Olah (born 1977), American artist
Katalin Oláh (born 1968), Hungarian orienteerer
Lóránt Oláh (born 1979), Serbian football player
Nicolaus Olahus (1493–1568), Hungarian archbishop
Tiberiu Olah (1928–2002), Hungarian musician

Other uses
Stadion Oláh Gábor Út, stadium in Debrecen, Hungary

See also
Olah (disambiguation)
Wallach
Wallachia

References

Hungarian-language surnames
Surnames of Hungarian origin
Hungarian words and phrases